Marie Detruyer (born 13 January 2004) is a Belgian footballer who plays as a midfielder for OH Leuven and the Belgium national team.

International career
Detruyer made her debut for the Belgium national team on 12 June 2021, in the match against Luxembourg.

References

2004 births
Living people
Women's association football midfielders
Belgian women's footballers
Belgium women's international footballers
Oud-Heverlee Leuven (women) players
Super League Vrouwenvoetbal players